The 2008–09 Meistriliiga season was the 19th season of the Meistriliiga, the top level of ice hockey in Estonia. Five teams participated in the league, and HK Stars Tallinn won the championship.

Regular season

Playoffs

Semifinals 
 Narva PSK – HK Stars Tallinn 1:2 (4:3, 2:7, 0:3)
 Tartu Välk 494 – Kohtla-Järve Viru Sputnik 0:2 (4:5, 4:6)

3rd place 
 Tartu Välk 494 – Narva PSK 7:2

Final 
 HK Stars Tallinn – Kohtla-Järve Viru Sputnik 3:1 (4:5 n.P., 6:4, 11:0, 7:2)

External links
Season on hockeyarchives.ru

Meistriliiga
Meistriliiga
Meistriliiga (ice hockey) seasons